The Rensselaer Engineers represented Rensselaer Polytechnic Institute in ECAC women's ice hockey during the 2014–15 NCAA Division I women's ice hockey season. The Engineers had their best season since 2010.

Offseason

October 1:Jordan Smelker ('14) was named a member of Team USA for the 4 Nations Cup, heldfrom November 4 to 8 in Sundsvall, Sweden.

Recruiting

2015–16 Engineers

Schedule

|-
!colspan=12 style="background:#F7001F;color:white;"| Regular Season

|-
!colspan=12 style="background:#F7001F;color:white;"| ECAC Tournament

Awards and honors

Lovisa Selander, G, Third Team ECAC All-Star

Lovisa Selander, G, ECAC All-Rookie Team

References

Rensselaer
RPI Engineers women's ice hockey seasons
RPI 
RPI